Robert Ley (15 February 1890 – 25 October 1945), a German politician and labour-union leader during the Nazi era, headed the German Labour Front from 1933 to 1945. He committed suicide while awaiting trial at Nuremberg for crimes against humanity and war crimes.

Early life
Ley was born in Niederbreidenbach (now a part of Nümbrecht) in the Rhine Province, the seventh of 11 children of a farmer, Friedrich Ley, and his wife Emilie (née Wald). He studied chemistry at the universities of Jena, Bonn, and Münster. He volunteered for the army on the outbreak of World War I in 1914 and spent two years in the 10th Foot Artillery Regiment and saw action on both the eastern and western fronts. In 1916 he was promoted to Leutnant and trained as an aerial artillery spotter with Artillery Flier Detachment 202. In July 1917 his aircraft was shot down over France and he was taken prisoner of war. It has been suggested that he suffered a traumatic brain injury in the crash; for the rest of his life he spoke with a stammer and suffered bouts of erratic behaviour, aggravated by heavy drinking. He earned the Iron Cross, 2nd class and the Wound Badge, in silver.

After the war Ley was released from captivity in January 1920 and returned to university, gaining a doctorate later that year. He was employed as a food chemist by a branch of the giant IG Farben company, based in Leverkusen in the Ruhr. Enraged by the French occupation of the Ruhr in 1924, Ley became an ultra-nationalist and joined the Nazi Party soon after reading Adolf Hitler's speech at his trial following the Beer Hall Putsch in Munich. Ley proved unswervingly loyal to Hitler, which led Hitler to ignore complaints about his arrogance, incompetence and drunkenness.

Ley's impoverished upbringing and his experience as head of the largely working-class Rhineland party region meant that he was sympathetic to those elements in the party who were open to socialism, but he always sided with Hitler in inner party disputes. This helped him survive the hostility of other party officials such as the party treasurer, Franz Xaver Schwarz, who regarded him as an incompetent drunk.

Rise in the Nazi Party
Ley rejoined the re-founded Nazi Party in March 1925, shortly after the ban on the Party was lifted (membership number 18,441). He was named Deputy Gauleiter of the Southern Rhineland (later, Rhineland) that month, and was promoted to Gauleiter on 17 July. In September 1925, he became a member of the National Socialist Working Association, a short-lived group of northern and western German Gauleiters, organized and led by Gregor Strasser, which supported the "socialist" wing of the Party and unsuccessfully sought to amend the Party program. At a meeting on 24 January 1926, however, Ley joined with others in raising objections to Strasser's proposed new draft program and it was shelved. Shortly thereafter, the Working Association was dissolved following the Bamberg Conference.

In March 1928, Ley became the editor and publisher of a virulently anti-Semitic Nazi newspaper, the Westdeutscher Beobachter (West German Observer) in Cologne. On 20 May 1928, he was elected to the Prussian Landtag, and also was appointed to the Rhenish provincial legislature. He was first elected to the Reichstag in September 1930 from electoral constituency 20, Cologne-Aachen. He remained as the Gauleiter of Rhineland until 1 June 1931 when his Gau was divided into two and new leaders named.

On 21 October 1931, Ley was brought to Munich party headquarters as the Deputy to  Strasser, then the head of party organization. Ley was styled Reichsorganisationsinspekteur and conducted inspection visits to the various Gaue. On 10 June 1932, following a further organizational restructuring by Strasser, Ley was named one of two Reichsinspecteurs with oversight of approximately half the Gaue. Furthermore, he was made the Acting Landesinspekteur for Bavaria with direct responsibility for the six Bavarian Gaue. This was a short-lived initiative by Strasser to centralize control over the Gaue. However, it was unpopular with the Gauleiters and was repealed on Strasser's fall from power. Strasser resigned on 8 December 1932 in a break with Hitler over the future direction of the Party. Hitler himself took over as Reichsorganisationsleiter and installed Ley as his Stabschef (Chief of Staff). The positions of Reichsinspecteur and  Landesinspekteur were abolished. When Hitler became Reich Chancellor in January 1933, Ley accompanied him to Berlin. On 2 June 1933, Ley was among those raised to Reichsleiter, the second highest political rank in the Nazi Party. On 3 October 1933, Ley was named to Hans Frank's Academy for German Law and, on 10 November 1934, Hitler finally formally promoted Ley to the position of Reichsorganisationsleiter.

Labour Front head

By April, 1933 Hitler decided to have the Nazi Party take over the trade union movement. On 10 May 1933, Hitler appointed Ley head of the newly founded German Labour Front (Deutsche Arbeitsfront, DAF). The DAF took over the existing Nazi trade union formation, the National Socialist Factory Cell Organisation (Nationalsozialistische Betriebszellenorganisation, NSBO) as well as the main trade union federation. But Ley's lack of administrative ability meant that the NSBO leader, Reinhold Muchow, a member of the socialist wing of the Nazi Party, soon became the dominant figure in the DAF, overshadowing Ley. Muchow began a purge of the DAF administration, rooting out ex-Social Democrats and ex-Communists and placing his own militants in their place.

The NSBO cells continued to agitate in the factories on issues of wages and conditions, annoying the employers, who soon complained to Hitler and other Nazi leaders that the DAF was as bad as the Communists had been.

Hitler had no sympathy with the syndicalist tendencies of the NSBO, and in January 1934 a new Law for the Ordering of National Labour effectively suppressed independent working-class factory organisations, even Nazi ones, and put questions of wages and conditions in the hands of the Trustees of Labour, dominated by the employers. At the same time Muchow was purged and Ley's control over the DAF re-established. The NSBO was completely suppressed and the DAF became little more than an arm of the state for the more efficient deployment and disciplining of labour to serve the needs of the regime, particularly its massive expansion of the arms industry.

As head of the Labour Front, Ley invited Edward, Duke of Windsor, and Wallis, Duchess of Windsor, to conduct a tour of Germany in 1937, months after Edward had abdicated the British throne. Ley served as their host and their personal chaperone. During the visit, Ley's alcoholism was noticed, and at one point he crashed the Windsors' car into a gate.

Once his power was established, Ley began to abuse it in a way that was conspicuous even by the standards of the Nazi regime. On top of his generous salaries as DAF head, Reichsorganisationsleiter, and Reichstag deputy, he pocketed the large profits of the Westdeutscher Beobachter, and freely embezzled DAF funds for his personal use. By 1938 he owned a luxurious estate near Cologne, a string of villas in other cities, a fleet of cars, a private railway carriage and a large art collection. He increasingly devoted his time to "womanising and heavy drinking, both of which often led to embarrassing scenes in public."

On 29 December 1942 his second wife Inge Ursula née Spilcker (1916–1942) shot herself after a drunken brawl  Ley's subordinates took their lead from him, and the DAF became a notorious centre of corruption, all paid for with the compulsory dues paid by German workers. One historian says: "The DAF quickly began to gain a reputation as perhaps the most corrupt of all the major institutions of the Third Reich. For this, Ley himself had to shoulder a large part of the blame."

Strength Through Joy 

Hitler and Ley were aware that the suppression of the trade unions and the prevention of wage increases by the Trustees of Labour system, when coupled with their relentless demands for increased productivity to hasten German rearmament, created a real risk of working-class discontent. In November 1933, as a means of preventing labour disaffection, the DAF established Strength Through Joy (Kraft durch Freude, KdF), to provide a range of benefits and amenities to the German working class and their families. These included subsidised holidays both at resorts across Germany and in "safe" countries abroad (particularly Italy). Two of the world's first purpose-built cruise-liners, the Wilhelm Gustloff and the Robert Ley, were built to take KdF members on Mediterranean cruises.

Other KdF programs included concerts, opera and other forms of entertainment in factories and other workplaces, free physical education and gymnastics training and coaching in sports such as football, tennis and sailing. All this was paid for by the DAF, at a cost of  a year by 1937, and ultimately by the workers themselves through their dues, although the employers also contributed. KdF was one of the Nazi regime's most popular programs, and played a large part in reconciling the working class to the regime, at least before 1939.

The DAF and KdF's most ambitious program was the "people's car," the Volkswagen, originally a project undertaken at Hitler's request by the car-maker Ferdinand Porsche. This brought Ley's old socialist tendencies back into prominence. The party, he said, had taken over where private industry had failed, because of the "short-sightedness, malevolence, profiteering and stupidity" of the business class. Now working for the DAF, Porsche built a new Volkswagen factory at Fallersleben, at a huge cost which was partly met by raiding the DAF's accumulated assets and misappropriating the dues paid by DAF members. The Volkswagen was sold to German workers on an installment plan, and the first models appeared in February 1939. The outbreak of war, however, meant that none of the 340,000 workers who paid for a car ever received one.

Wartime role 
Ley said in a speech in 1939: "We National Socialists have monopolized all resources and all our energies during the past seven years so as to be able to be equipped for the supreme effort of battle." (→ German rearmament) After the beginning of World War II in September 1939, Ley's importance declined. The militarisation of the workforce and the diversion of resources to the war greatly reduced the role of the DAF, and the KdF was largely curtailed. Ley's drunkenness and erratic behaviour were less tolerated in wartime, and he was supplanted by Armaments Minister Fritz Todt and his successor Albert Speer as the czar of the German workforce (the head of the Organisation Todt (OT)). As German workers were increasingly conscripted, foreign workers, first "guest workers" from France and later slave labourers from Poland, Ukraine and other eastern countries, were brought in to replace them. Ley played some role in this program, but was overshadowed by Fritz Sauckel, General Plenipotentiary for the Distribution of Labour (Generalbevollmächtigter für den Arbeitseinsatz) since March 1942.

Nevertheless, Ley was deeply implicated in the mistreatment of foreign slave workers. In October 1942 he attended a meeting in Essen with Paul Plieger (head of the giant Hermann Göring Works industrial combine) and leaders of the German coal industry. A verbatim account of the meeting was kept by one of the managers. A recent historian writes:

Despite his failings, Ley retained Hitler's favour; until the last months of the war he was part of Hitler's inner circle along with Martin Bormann and Joseph Goebbels. In November 1940 he was given a new role, as Reich Commissioner for Social Housing Construction (Reichskommissar für den sozialen Wohnungsbau), later shortened to Reich Housing Commissioner (Reichswohnungskommissar). Here his job was to prepare for the effects on German housing of the expected Allied air attacks on German cities, which began to increase in intensity from 1941 onwards. In this role he became a key ally of Armaments Minister Albert Speer, who recognised that German workers must be adequately housed if productivity was to be maintained. As the air war against Germany increased from 1943, "dehousing" German workers became an objective of the Allied area bombing campaign, and Ley's organisation was increasingly unable to cope with the resulting housing crisis.

He was aware in general terms of the Nazi regime's programme of extermination of the Jews of Europe. Ley encouraged it through the virulent anti-Semitism of his publications and speeches. In February 1941 he was present at a meeting along with Speer, Bormann and Field Marshal Wilhelm Keitel at which Hitler had set out his views on the "Jewish question" at some length, making it clear that he intended the "disappearance" of the Jews one way or another. According to American historian Jeffrey Herf, Ley issued some of the most overt propaganda accusing Jews of plotting the extermination of Germans and threatening to do the reverse. In December 1939, he said that in the event of a British victory:

In April 1945, Ley became enamored with the idea of creating a "death ray" after receiving a letter from an unnamed inventor: "I've studied the documentation; there's no doubt about it. This will be the decisive weapon!" Once Ley gave Speer a list of materials, including a particular model circuit breaker, Speer found that the circuit breaker had not been manufactured in 40 years.

Postwar; arrest and suicide 

As Nazi Germany collapsed in early 1945, Ley was among the government figures who remained fanatically loyal to Hitler. He last saw Hitler on 20 April 1945, Hitler's birthday, in the Führerbunker in central Berlin. The next day he left for southern Bavaria, in the expectation that Hitler would make his last stand in the "National Redoubt" in the alpine areas. When Hitler refused to leave Berlin, Ley was effectively unemployed.

On 16 May he was captured by American paratroopers of the 101st Airborne Division in a shoemaker's house in the village of Schleching. Ley told them he was "Dr Ernst Distelmeyer," but he was identified by Franz Xaver Schwarz, the treasurer of the Nazi Party and a long-time enemy. After his arrest, he declared "You can torture or beat me or impale me on a stake. But I will never doubt the greater deeds of Hitler."

At the Nuremberg Trials, Ley was indicted under Count One ("The Common Plan or Conspiracy to wage an aggressive war in violation of international law or treaties"), Count Three (War Crimes, including among other things "mistreatment of prisoners of war or civilian populations") and Count Four ("Crimes Against Humanity – murder, extermination, enslavement of civilian populations; persecution on the basis of racial, religious or political grounds"). Ley was apparently indignant at being regarded as a war criminal, telling the American psychiatrist Douglas Kelley and psychologist Gustave Gilbert who had seen and tested him in prison: "Stand us against a wall and shoot us, well and good, you are victors. But why should I be brought before a Tribunal like a c-c-c- ... I can't even get the word out!".

On 24 October, three days after receiving the indictment, Ley strangled himself to death in his prison cell using a noose made by tearing a towel into strips, fastened to the toilet pipe in his cell.

See also 
 Glossary of Nazi Germany
 List of Nazi Party leaders and officials
 List of people who died by suicide by hanging

Notes

References

Citations

Bibliography

External links 

 Ley's 1936 speech to Nazi Party factory activists
 
 

1890 births
1945 deaths
1945 suicides
Gauleiters
German Army personnel of World War I
German people who died in prison custody
German prisoners of war in World War I
Members of the Academy for German Law
Members of the Landtag of Prussia
Members of the Reichstag of Nazi Germany
Members of the Reichstag of the Weimar Republic
National Socialist Working Association members
Nazi Party officials
Nazi Party politicians
Nazis who committed suicide in Germany
Nazis who committed suicide in prison custody
Officials of Nazi Germany
People from Oberbergischer Kreis
People from the Rhine Province
Prisoners who died in United States military detention
Recipients of the Iron Cross (1914), 2nd class
Reichsleiters
Suicides by hanging in Germany
University of Bonn alumni
University of Jena alumni
University of Münster alumni